Gjergj Qiriazi (George D. Kyrias) (1868–1912) was an Albanian patriot, author, educator, translator, Protestant Bible distributor, organizer of the First Congress of Monastir (1908), and activist of the Albanian National Awakening.

Early Years and Education
Gjergj Qiriazi was born in Monastir (modern Bitola), Ottoman Empire (now North Macedonia), where he attended school.

Like his brother Gjerasim, he went on to study at the Collegiate and Theological Institute, a Protestant institution in Samokov, Bulgaria. Alexander Thomson sponsored his education. He attended the school in 1885–1889, but left Bulgaria before graduating, to avoid mandatory conscription into the Bulgarian army.

Biography
He worked for the American Bible Society in Salonica, and then for the British and Foreign Bible Society, and took over the direction of the first Albanian girls' school in Korçë upon the death of his brother. In 1908 he was the president of the Albanian Bashkimi club in Monastir and later became vice-president. In 1908, he was a delegate at the Congress of Monastir. Qiriazi also worked as an interpreter at the Austro-Hungarian consulate in Bitola. A Turkish language high school (idadiye) for boys was created in 1908 and Qiriazi was appointed as a teacher of the Albanian language. In 1909, the Young Turk government planned to assassinate Qiriazi for his involvement in the Albanian national movement.

Gjergj Qiriazi was one of the founders of the Albanian printing press Bashkimi i Kombit. He helped his brother Gejrasim to publish two volumes of literature, namely Hristomathi a udhëheqës për ç'do shtëpi shqiptari (Monastir, 1902) and a co-wrote with him a collection of religious verse Kënkë të shenjtëruara (Monastir, 1906).

Qiriazi also translated John Bunyan's Pilgrim's Progress as Udhëtari, printed in 1927 by Dhori Koti publishers.

Published Works
Udhëtari nga kjo Botë ndë tjetërën, a Udha e të Krishterit nga qytet i humbjes gjer ndë qytet të Qiellit, e treguarë si ëndërë prej Jovan Benjian (translated from The Pilgrim's Progress, with introduction, in 1894). Korçë: Dhori Koti, 1927. Republished in original and with updated spelling – Tirana: Instituti për Studime Shqiptare dhe Protestante, 2018–2019.
Fisika. Bukuresht: Dituria, 1899.
"Shqiponja". Albania, 1900, nr. 11, dhjetor.
"Nevojat e Shqipërisë: ca mentime". Albania, 1901, nr. 1, 31 janar.
"Një udhë[tim] në Shqipëri" Albania, 1901, nr. 5, maj.
"Urtësia e dituria". Albania, 1901, nr. 9, shtator.
"Zër' i skolisë". Albania, 1901, nr. 10, tetor.
Hristomathi më katër pjesë: gjëra të ndryshme e të vëgjejtura për këndim edhe për dobi të mësonjëtorevet shqipe, a udhëheqës për ç’do shtëpi shqipëtari, të gatuara edhe një pjesë nga dialogët të kthyera, prej një mëmëdhetari (editor, co-author with Gjerasim Qiriazi). Sofia: Mbrothësia, 1902 (vol. 1) and 1907 (vol. 2). Republished 2023 (Tirana: ISSHP) as Krestomaci: udhëheqës për çdo shtëpi shqiptari ( and ).
"Fati i Shqipërisë". Albania, 1903, nr. 7, korrik.
"Shkaku i të mos mbrothësuarit të shkronjave shqip në Shqipëri". Kalendari Kombiar 1905, IX. Sofje, 49-61.
 "Arësim i gravet". Drita, Sofje, nr. 82, 9 gusht 1906.
Kënkë të Shenjtëruara për falëtoret shqipe (të kthyera prej anglishtesë, gerqishtesë edhe bullgarishtesë). Sofia: Mbrothësia (Kristo Luarasi), 1906.
"Nevojat që kemi për të qytetëruarë Shqipërinë me anën e diturisë". Korça, nr. 3, 7 janar 1909.
"Nevoja për të përhapurë mjeshtërinë ndë Shqipëri". Korça, nr. 6, 18 shkurt 1909.
Këngë të shenjtëruara për falëtoret shqipe. Korçë: Dhori Koti, 1927.

See also
 Kyrias Family

Further reading 
 Lloshi, Xhevat. Gjergj Qiriazi në Kongresin e Manastirit.
 Hosaflook, David. Lëvizja Protestante te shqiptarët, 1816–1908. Skopje: Instituti i Trashëgimisë Shpirtërore e Kulturore të Shqiptarëve, 2019, .
 Qiriazi-Dako, Sevasti (trans. Holger Dashi). Jeta ime. Shkup: Instituti i Trashëgimisë Shpirtërore e Kulturore të Shqiptarëve, 2016, .
 Quanrud, John and David Hosaflook. "Were the Kyrias siblings, Kristo Dako, and the Kortcha Girls School Protestant? A response to the re-emergence of a communist-era narrative". IAPS, 2023 (or in Albanian – https://instituti.org/vellezerit-dhe-motrat-qiriazi-kristo-dako-dhe-shkolla-e-vashave-e-korces-a-ishin-protestante

References

1868 births
1912 deaths
People from Bitola
People from Manastir vilayet
Albanian Protestants
19th-century Albanian writers
Albanian publishers (people)
Albanian educators
Activists of the Albanian National Awakening
20th-century Albanian writers
English–Albanian translators
Albanian schoolteachers
Congress of Elbasan delegates
19th-century translators
Gjergj